Dolosigranulum pigrum  is a Gram-positive bacterium from the genus of Dolosigranulum. Dolosigranulum pigrum can cause infections in the upper respiratory tract and nosocomial pneumonia and sepsis.
The metabolism of this organism has been reconstructed and is available in the form of a genome-scale metabolic model.

References 

Lactobacillales
Bacteria described in 1994